Forester is a rural locality in the local government area (LGA) of Dorset in the North-east LGA region of Tasmania. The 2016 census recorded a population of 8 for the state suburb of Forester.

History 
Forester was gazetted as a locality in 1969. 

The locality is a logging area.

Geography
The Great Forester River forms a small part of the western boundary. The Tomahawk River rises in the locality and flows through to the north.

Road infrastructure 
Route C834 (Forester Road) passes through from south-west to south-east. Route C832 (Waterhouse Road) runs along part of the western boundary.

References

Towns in Tasmania
Localities of Dorset Council (Australia)